Roman Syria was an early Roman province annexed to the Roman Republic in 64 BC by Pompey in the Third Mithridatic War following the defeat of King of Armenia Tigranes the Great, who had become the protector of the Hellenistic kingdom of Syria.

Following the partition of the Herodian Kingdom of Judea into a tetrarchy in 4 BC, it was gradually absorbed into Roman provinces, with Roman Syria annexing Iturea and Trachonitis.

Provincia Syria 

Syria was annexed to the Roman Republic in 64 BC, when Pompey the Great had the Seleucid king Antiochus XIII Asiaticus executed and deposed his successor Philip II Philoromaeus. Pompey appointed Marcus Aemilius Scaurus to the post of Proconsul of Syria.

Following the fall of the Roman Republic and its transformation into the Roman Empire, Syria became a Roman imperial province, governed by a Legate. During the early empire, the Roman army in Syria accounted for three legions with auxiliaries who defended the border with Parthia.

In 6 AD, Emperor Augustus deposed the ethnarch Herod Archelaus and united Judea, Samaria and Idumea into the Roman province of Judea; such province was placed under the direct authority of the Legate of Syria Publius Sulpicius Quirinius, who appointed Coponius as Prefect of Judea. Following the death of Herod Philip II (34 AD) and the removal of Herod Antipas (39 AD) Ituraea, Trachonitis, Galilee and Perea were also transferred under the jurisdiction of the province of Syria.

From 37 to 41 AD, much of Palestine was separated from Syria and transformed into a client kingdom under Herod Agrippa I. After Agrippa's death, his kingdom was gradually re-absorbed into the Roman Empire, until it was officially transformed into a Roman province following the death of Herod Agrippa II.

Syrian province forces were directly engaged in the First Jewish–Roman War of 66–70 AD. In 66 AD, Cestius Gallus, legate of Syria, brought the Syrian army, based on Legio XII Fulminata, reinforced by auxiliary troops, to restore order in Judaea and quell the revolt. The legion, however, was ambushed and destroyed by Jewish rebels at the Battle of Beth Horon, a result that shocked the Roman leadership. The future emperor Vespasian was then put in charge of subduing the Jewish revolt. In the summer of 69, Vespasian, with the Syrian units supporting him, launched his bid to become Roman emperor. He defeated his rival Vitellius and ruled as emperor for ten years when he was succeeded by his son Titus.

Based on an inscription recovered from Dor in 1948, Gargilius Antiquus was known to have been the governor of a province in the eastern part of the Empire, possibly Syria, between his consulate and governing Asia. In November 2016, an inscription in Greek was recovered off the coast of Dor by Haifa University underwater archaeologists, which attests that Antiquus was governor of the province of Judea between 120 and 130, possibly prior to the Bar Kokhba revolt.

As related by Theodor Mommsen,

"Hadrian stationed an extra legion in Judaea, renaming it Syria Palaestina." This was following the defeat of the Bar Kokhba Revolt in 135 AD. The Syria-based legion, Legio III Gallica, took part in the quelling of the revolt in 132–136, and in the aftermath, the emperor Hadrian renamed the greatly depopulated province of Judea and its extra legion Syria Palaestina.

Aftermath

Division into Coele Syria and Syria Phoenice

Septimius Severus divided the province of Syria proper into Syria Coele and Syria Phoenice, with Antioch and Tyre as their respective provincial capitals.

As related by Theodor Mommsen,

From the later 2nd century, the Roman Senate included several notable Syrians, including Claudius Pompeianus and Avidius Cassius.

Syria was of crucial strategic importance during the Crisis of the Third Century. In 244 AD, Rome was ruled by a native Syrian from Philippopolis (modern day Shahba) in the province of Arabia Petraea. The emperor was Marcus Iulius Philippus, more commonly known as Philip the Arab. Philip became the 33rd emperor of Rome upon its millennial celebration.

Roman Syria was invaded in 252/253 (the date is disputed) after a Roman field army was destroyed in the Battle of Barbalissos by the King of Persia Shapur I which left the Euphrates river unguarded and the region was pillaged by the Persians. In 259/260 a similar event happened when Shapur I again defeated a Roman field army and captured the Roman emperor, Valerian, alive at the Battle of Edessa. Again, Roman Syria suffered as cities were captured, sacked and pillaged.

From 268 to 273, Syria was part of the breakaway Palmyrene Empire.

Dominate reform
Following the reforms of Diocletian, Syria Coele became part of the Diocese of the East. Sometime between 330 and 350 (likely c. 341), the province of Euphratensis was created out of the territory of Syria Coele along the western bank of the Euphrates and the former Kingdom of Commagene, with Hierapolis as its capital.

Syria in the Byzantine Empire

After c. 415, Syria Coele was further subdivided into Syria I (or Syria Prima), with its capital remaining at Antioch, and Syria II (Syria Secunda) or Syria Salutaris, with its capital at Apamea on the Orontes. In 528, Justinian I carved out the small coastal province Theodorias out of territory from both provinces.

The region remained one of the most important provinces of the Byzantine Empire. It was occupied by the Sasanians between 609 and 628, then reconquered by the emperor Heraclius, but lost again to the advancing Muslims after the Battle of Yarmouk and the fall of Antioch.
The city of Antioch was reconquered by Nikephorus Phocas in 963, along with other parts of the country, at that time under the Hamdanids, although still under the official suzerainty of the Abbasid caliphs and also claimed by the Fatimid caliphs. After emperor John Kurkuas failed to conquer Syria up to Jerusalem, a Muslim "reconquest" of Syria followed in the late 970s undertaken by the Fatimid Caliphate that resulted in the ouster of the Byzantines from most parts of Syria. However, Antioch and other northern parts of Syria remained in the empire and other parts were under the protection of the emperors through their Hamdanid, Mirdasid, and Marwanid proxies, until the Seljuk arrival, who after three decades of incursions, conquered Antioch in 1084. Antioch was captured again during the 12th century by the revived armies of the Comnenii. However, by that time the city was regarded as part of Asia Minor and not of Syria.

Episcopal sees 
Ancient episcopal sees of the late Roman province of Syria Prima (I) listed in the Annuario Pontificio as titular sees:
 Anasartha (Khanasir)
 Barcusus (Baquza or Banqusa)
 Beroea (Aleppo)
 Chalcis in Syria (Qinnasrin)
 Gabala (Jableh)
 Gabula (at the marsh of Al-Jabbul)
 Gindarus (Jandairis)
 Laodicea in Syria (Latakia)
 Salamias (Salamiyah)
 Seleucia Pieria

Ancient episcopal sees of the late Roman province of Syria Secunda (II) listed in the Annuario Pontificio as titular sees:
 '''Apamea in Syria, the Metropolitan Archdiocese 
 Arethusa (Al-Rastan)
 Balanea (Baniyas)
 Epiphania in Syria (Hama)
 Larissa in Syria (Shaizar)
 Mariamme (Maryamin)
 Raphanea 
 Seleucobelus (Seleucopolis)

See also
History of Syria
Ottoman Syria
Assyria (Roman province)
List of governors of Roman Syria

References

Sources

External links

 
Seleucid Empire successor states
Former countries in Western Asia
60s BC establishments
1st-century BC establishments in the Roman Republic
States and territories disestablished in the 2nd century
198 disestablishments
190s disestablishments in the Roman Empire
1st-century BC establishments
2nd-century disestablishments
Jews and Judaism in the Roman Empire